Loeak (/ˈlɔɪˌæk/) is a Marshallese surname. Notable people with the surname include:

Albert Loeak (died 1976), Marshallese chief
Anjua Loeak (died 2016), one of four paramount chiefs in the Marshall Islands
Christopher Loeak (born 1952), President of the Marshall Islands 
Surnames of Marshall Islands origin

Marshallese-language surnames